Alojz Kerštajn (25 March 1947 – 1999) was a Slovenian cross-country skier. He competed in the men's 15 kilometre event at the 1968 Winter Olympics.

References

1947 births
1999 deaths
Slovenian male cross-country skiers
Olympic cross-country skiers of Yugoslavia
Cross-country skiers at the 1968 Winter Olympics
Sportspeople from Jesenice, Jesenice